Opfertshofen was a municipality in the canton of Schaffhausen in the north of Switzerland. On 1 January 2009 Opfershofen merged with Altdorf, Bibern, Hofen, and Thayngen to form the municipality of Thayngen.

References

Former municipalities of the canton of Schaffhausen
Former municipalities of Switzerland